Comtesse de la Châtre is a 1789 painting by Élisabeth Vigée Le Brun which is in the collection of the Metropolitan Museum of Art in New York.

Description 
The portrait depicts Comtesse de la Châtre, wife of the Comte de la Châtre and future wife of François Arnail de Jaucourt. She had a penchant for wearing white muslin dresses, both for daily purposes and for portraits.

The artist, Élisabeth Vigée Le Brun, was a French painter who painted some 600 portraits in addition to landscapes.

The work is on view at The Metropolitan Museum's Gallery 631.

References

External links 
 Marie Antoinette's: Femme of the Week: Comtesse de la Châtre

Metropolitan Museum of Art 2017 drafts
Paintings in the collection of the Metropolitan Museum of Art
1789 paintings
Paintings by Élisabeth Vigée Le Brun
Books in art